Qaleh-ye Qobad or Qaleh Qobad may refer to:
 Qaleh-ye Qobad, Hamadan
 Qaleh-ye Qobad, Kermanshah